Chesapeake and Ohio No. 490 is the sole survivor of the L-1 class 4-6-4 "Hudson" type steam locomotives. It was built by Alco's Richmond works in 1926 as an F-19 class 4-6-2 "Pacific" type to be used to pull the Chesapeake and Ohio's secondary passenger trains. It was eventually rebuilt in 1947 to become a streamlined 4-6-4 for the C&O's Chessie streamliner. After the Chessie was cancelled, No. 490 remained in secondary passenger service, until it was retired in 1953. It spent several years in storage in Huntington, West Virginia, until 1968, when it was donated to the B&O Railroad Museum in Baltimore, Maryland. It remains on static display at the museum, as of 2023.

History 
After World War I, the Chesapeake and Ohio Railway, a class 1 railroad that ran through West Virginia, Ohio, and Maryland, was facing a major increase in passenger traffic, and a larger locomotive was required to pull the heavier trains. The C&O approached the American Locomotive Company's Richmond, Virginia works and ordered a new fleet of 4-6-2 "Pacifics", including the F-19 class. The F-19s were constructed in 1926, being numbered 490-494, and they were the last newly-built 4-6-2s the C&O received (later pacifics would be bought secondhand from the Richmond, Fredericksburg and Potomac Railroad). No. 490 was the first locomotive of the class, and it was initially assigned to pull mainline trains east of Charlottesville, and in 1930, it was reassigned to pull the C&O's premiere passenger train, The Sportsman between Washington, D.C. and Cincinnati, Ohio, as well as the George Washington between D.C. and Louisville, Kentucky. In 1933, No. 490's original Vanderbilt tender was swapped for a modern VA tender to increase its water capacity by 6,000 gallons.

By 1942, No. 490 was downgraded to secondary passenger service after the C&O had ordered larger locomotives to meet the demand for more power in passenger service, such as their 4-6-4 "Hudsons" and their 4-8-4 "Greenbriers". During World War II, the C&O's president, Robert R. Young, began designing a new passenger train with the hopes of upgrading the C&O's passenger fleet. The train was planned to be called the Chessie, and it was meant to be primarily hauled by M-1 class steam turbine locomotives between D.C. and Cincinnati. The C&O also decided to convert their F-19 locomotives into 4-6-4s to help serve the Chessie as well, so they sent No. 490 to their Huntington, West Virginia shops in 1947 to become heavily rebuilt. No. 490's original Baker valve gear was replaced with Franklyn type A poppet valve gear, an extra trailing axle was added beneath the new, larger firebox, the locomotive received roller bearings, it received a front-end throttle, it received a high-speed booster, it received a cross counterbalance, it became shrouded with fluted, stainless steel streamlining similar to that on the M-1s, and it was reclassified as an L-1. The other F-19s went through the same rebuilding process, except No. 494 ended up being the only one without streamlining.

By 1948, passenger traffic on the C&O had declined, and due to how costly the Chessie was planned to be, it was cancelled before service could begin. While equipment for the train was being auctioned off, No. 490 and the other L-1s subsequently proceeded to pull secondary passenger trains and mail trains alongside the L-2 class 4-6-4s, despite having already been modified for premiere passenger service. However, this appeared less and less often as time flew by. Since the L-1's new streamlined looks were mostly yellow, they were nicknamed "Yellowbellies" by crews. 1953 was the last year No. 490 had ever moved under its own power, and it became the last steam locomotive to pull a scheduled passenger train on the C&O in April of that year before its fire was dropped. No. 490 spent the fifteen years being stored in Huntington, and by the end of the 1950s, No. 490 became the last C&O 4-6-4 to ever survive the scrapper's torch.

In 1968, the C&O donated No. 490 to the B&O Railroad Museum with the hopes of putting it on static display. A cosmetic restoration took place in 1971, and the locomotive was subsequently moved to the museum's property in Baltimore the following year. Since its arrival at the museum, No. 490 would spend several decades being left on static display outdoors alongside other locomotives, including Baltimore and Ohio 4-6-2 No. 5300, 2-8-2 No. 4500, and Reading Company 4-8-4 No. 2101. The last remaining L-1 would slowly deteriorate as a result of being exposed to the elements, but museum volunteers have given the locomotive one cosmetic repaint in the early 1990s. In 2005, No. 490 was moved inside one of the museum's buildings to be protected form further deterioration. As of 2023, No. 490 remains on static display inside one of the museum's buildings, waiting for another eventual cosmetic refurbishment.

See also 

 Chesapeake and Ohio classes L-2 and L-2-A
 Chesapeake and Ohio class M-1
 Baltimore and Ohio 5300

External links 
B&O Railroad Museum website

References 

4-6-2 locomotives
4-6-4 locomotives
Standard gauge locomotives of the United States
490
Individual locomotives of the United States
Streamlined steam locomotives
Preserved steam locomotives of Maryland
Passenger locomotives
ALCO locomotives
Railway locomotives introduced in 1926